Clodomiro Carranza (born 26 April 1982) is an Argentinian professional golfer who currently plays on the PGA Tour Latinoamérica, having previously played on the European Tour, Web.com Tour and Tour de las Américas.

Professional career
Carranza turned professional in 2002 and played much of his early career on the Argentine national professional golf tour. His first professional win came at the 2005 Acantilados Grand Prix on the PGA of Argentina Tour.

In 2005 Carranza became a member of the Tour de las Américas and achieved his first win on the tour at the 2008 Carlos Franco Invitational.

From 2005 to 2008 Carranza also played a limited number of events on the Challenge Tour before gaining playing rights for the European Tour for the 2010 and 2011 seasons. However Carranza failed to find success on the European Tour achieving just one top ten finish in 41 career events, eventually losing his tour card following the 2011 season.

In 2012 Carranza joined PGA Tour Latinoamérica and was quickly successful winning the Brazil Open in just his fourth start on the tour.  This win coupled with a further four top-10 finishes propelled Carranza to a 3rd place finish on the PGA Tour Latinoamérica Order of Merit which earned him playing rights on the Web.com Tour for the 2013 season.

2012 was a successful year for Carranza as he also won the Abierto de La Rioja and Abierto Termas de Río Hondo on his native PGA of Argentina Tour.

In 2013 Carranza mainly played on the Web.com Tour but had a disappointing year with just two top-25 finishes in 19 appearances.

Professional wins (11)

PGA Tour Latinoamérica wins (2)

Tour de las Américas wins (1)

1Co-sanctioned by the TPG Tour

TPG Tour wins (7)

1Co-sanctioned by the Tour de las Américas

Ángel Cabrera Tour wins (1)
2016 Fecha 2

Other wins (1)
 2005 Acantilados Grand Prix

References

External links
 
 
 Clodomiro Carranza at the TPG Tour official site
 

Argentine male golfers
PGA Tour Latinoamérica golfers
Sportspeople from Córdoba Province, Argentina
People from Río Cuarto, Córdoba
1982 births
Living people